Dirty Bird or Dirty Birds may refer to:

A nickname for Wild Turkey (bourbon)
Sister Sparrow & the Dirty Birds, a New York-based seven-piece soul/rock band
 Sister Sparrow & the Dirty Birds (album), a 2010 album by the band
Dirty Bird (football dance), a celebratory dance popularized by Jamal Anderson of the Atlanta Falcons
The Atlanta Falcons, a nickname the team earned during the 1998 NFL season due to the dance of the same name.

See also
The Case of the Dirty Bird, a 1992 children's book
Columbidae, the genus including pigeons